Strikes Twice  is an album by Larry Carlton, released in 1981.

Track listing
All tracks composed and arranged by Larry Carlton; except where indicated
"Strikes Twice" 	5:18
"Ain't Nothin' for a Heartache" (Kerry Chater, Baron Longfellow) 3:16
"Midnight Parade" 5:06
"The Magician" (Carlton, John Townsend) 4:11
"Springville" 	6:36
"Mulberry Street" 	7:15
"In My Blood" (Carlton, John Townsend) 4:09
"For Love Alone" 	4:59

Personnel
 Larry Carlton – guitar, synthesizer, vocals
 Don Freeman – keyboards
 Brian Mann – keyboards
 Greg Mathieson – keyboards
 Terry Trotter – keyboards
 Robert "Pops" Popwell – bass guitar
 John Ferraro – drums
 Paulinho Da Costa – percussion
 Steve Carlton - Recording Engineer

References

1981 albums
Larry Carlton albums
Warner Records albums